Punctoidea is a superfamily of air-breathing land snails and slugs, terrestrial pulmonate gastropod mollusks in the informal group Sigmurethra.

Taxonomy 
The superfamily Punctoidea is classified within the clade Stylommatophora within the clade Eupulmonata. As of 2017, it contains the following families:
 † Afrodontops Kadolsky, 2020 
Charopidae Hutton, 1884
Cystopeltidae Cockerell, 1891
Discidae Thiele, 1931 (1866)
Endodontidae Pilsbry, 1895
Helicodiscidae Pilsbry, 1927
 Oopeltidae Cockerell, 1891
Oreohelicidae Pilsbry, 1939
Punctidae Morse, 1864

References

Stylommatophora
Gastropod superfamilies